Problepsis maxima is a moth of the family Geometridae. It is found in Japan.

References

Moths described in 1905
Scopulini
Moths of Japan